The Chandigarh football team is an Indian football team representing Chandigarh in Indian state football competitions including the Santosh Trophy. They have never won it.

Current squad

Sources:

Honours
 B.C. Roy Trophy
 Winners (2): 2009–10, 2010–11
 Mir Iqbal Hussain Trophy
 Runners-up (1): 2011–12

References

Santosh Trophy teams
Football in Chandigarh